The following is an alphabetical list of articles related to Lithuania.

0-9
1926 Lithuanian coup d'état
1938 Polish ultimatum to Lithuania
1939 German ultimatum to Lithuania
1940 Soviet ultimatum to Lithuania

A
Act of Independence of Lithuania
Act of the Re-Establishment of the State of Lithuania
Administrative divisions of Lithuania
Agriculture in Lithuania
Alytus
Alytus County
Aukštojas Hill

B
Baltic Sea
Baltic states under Soviet rule (1944–1991)
Baltic Way
Balts
Bank of Lithuania
Buddhism in Lithuania

C
Cantemus
Christianization of Lithuania
Cinema of Lithuania
Coat of arms of Lithuania
Constitution of Lithuania
Constitutional Court of Lithuania
Counties of Lithuania
Culture of Lithuania

D
Demographics of Lithuania
Duchy of Lithuania

E
Economy of Lithuania
Education in Lithuania
Elderships of Lithuania
Elections in Lithuania
Energy in Lithuania
Ethnic minorities in Lithuania
Extreme points of Lithuania

F
Flag of Lithuania
Flora of Lithuania
Football in Lithuania
Foreign relations of Lithuania
Forest Brothers

G
Geography of Lithuania
Government of Lithuania
Grand Duchy of Lithuania
Great Seimas of Vilnius

H
Hinduism in Lithuania
History of Lithuania
History of Lithuania (1219–1295)
History of the Polish–Lithuanian Commonwealth (1569–1648)
History of the Polish–Lithuanian Commonwealth (1648–1764)
History of the Polish–Lithuanian Commonwealth (1764–1795)
History of the Jews in Lithuania

I
International rankings of Lithuania
Islam in Lithuania

J
January Events (Lithuania)
Japanese-Lithuanian Hieroglyphs Dictionary
Jarosekas Quartet

K
Kaunas
Kaunas County
Kingdom of Lithuania
Klaipėda
Klaipėda County

L
.lt
Law enforcement in Lithuania
Law of Lithuania
LGBT rights in Lithuania
Lipka Tatars
List of airports in Lithuania
List of birds of Lithuania
List of cities in Lithuania
List of companies of Lithuania
List of diplomatic missions in Lithuania
List of diplomatic missions of Lithuania
List of forests in Lithuania
List of lakes in Lithuania
List of mammals of Lithuania
List of museums in Lithuania
List of national parks in the Baltics
List of political parties in Lithuania
List of regional parks of Lithuania
List of rivers of Lithuania
List of rulers of Lithuania
List of World Heritage Sites in Northern Europe
Lithuania
Lithuania at the Olympics
Lithuania proper
Lithuanian Air Force
Lithuanian Armed Forces
Lithuanian cuisine
Lithuanian Land Force
Lithuanian language
Lithuanian litas
Lithuanian literature
Lithuanian military ranks and insignia
Lithuanian mythology
Lithuanian National Revival
Lithuanian Naval Force
Lithuanian people
Lithuanian press ban
Lithuanian Railways
Lithuanian–Soviet War
Lithuanian Special Operations Force
Lithuanian Wars of Independence

M
Marijampolė
Marijampolė County
Ministry of National Defence (Lithuania)
Municipalities of Lithuania
Music of Lithuania

N
Name of Lithuania
NASDAQ OMX Vilnius
Nemunas Delta

O
Occupation and illegal annexation of the Baltic states by the Soviet Union (1940)
Occupation of Lithuania by Nazi Germany
Occupation of the Baltic states
Occupation of the Baltic states by the Soviet Union (1944)
Outline of Lithuania

P
Panevėžys
Panevėžys County
Partitions of Poland
Polish–Lithuanian Commonwealth
Polish–Lithuanian War
Politics of Lithuania
Port of Klaipėda
Prime Minister of Lithuania
Public holidays in Lithuania

Q

R
Regions of Lithuania
Religion in Lithuania
Renewable energy in Lithuania
Resistance in Lithuania during World War II

S
Sąjūdis
Seimas
Singing Revolution
Sport in Lithuania
Symbols of Lithuania

Š
Šiauliai
Šiauliai County

T
Tauragė
Tauragė County
Tautiška giesmė
Telecommunications in Lithuania
Television in Lithuania
Telšiai
Telšiai County
The Holocaust in Lithuania
Tourism in Lithuania
Transport in Lithuania

U
Union of Lublin
Utena
Utena County

V
Vilnius
Vilnius County

W
Wind power in Lithuania

X

Y

Z

 Žemaitukas
 Žirmūnai

See also

Topic overview:
Lithuania
Outline of Lithuania

External links

 
Lithuania
Lithuania